Thomas Patrick Sheehan (November 6, 1877 – May 22, 1959) was an American professional baseball third baseman. He played in Major League Baseball (MLB) in 1900 and from 1906 through 1908 for the New York Giants, Pittsburgh Pirates, and Brooklyn Superbas.

External links
, or Retrosheet

1877 births
1959 deaths
Baseball players from Sacramento, California
Brooklyn Superbas players
Major League Baseball third basemen
Meriden Silverites players
New York Giants (NL) players
Oakland Commuters players
Pittsburgh Pirates players
Portland Beavers players
Sacramento Gilt Edges players
Sacramento Sacts players
Sacramento Senators players
Stockton Millers players
Tacoma Tigers players
Worcester Farmers players